John de Havilland may refer to:

 John de Havilland (officer of arms) (1826–1886),  officer of arms at the College of Arms in London
 John de Havilland (pilot) (1918–1943), British test pilot